Wilhelm August Golicke (1802  –  5 July 1848) was a Baltic German painter.

Life and paintings 
He was born in Tallinn or Saint Petersburg. He grew up in the German community of Tallinn ("Reval", in German), and studied in Saint Petersburg at the studios of the English painter George Dawe.

Between 1822 and 1828 Dawe, together  with Golicke and another of his students, Alexander Polyakov, a serf, painted 332 portraits of Tsarist Generals who had distinguished themselves in the war against Napoleon. The paintings were placed in the Military Gallery of the Winter Palace. Dawe became a good friend of Golicke's during their work together and left him an annuity in his will.

After Dawes' death, Golicke studied at the Imperial Academy of Arts. He graduated in 1832 and was named an "Independent Artist" (Cвободный Xудожник), a sign of official recognition. In 1837, he visited England and Italy. He died in Saint Petersburg, of cholera, in 1848.

His post-Dawe work consisted largely of genre paintings, still-lifes and scenes from history. Many of his works can be seen at the Tretyakov Gallery in Moscow.

References

External links 
 PetroArt: Brief ungrammatical biography of Golicke with link to portraits.
 AskArt: "The Fruit Seller" and "The Fisherman", by Golicke

1802 births
1848 deaths
Portrait painters
19th-century painters from the Russian Empire
Russian male painters
19th-century male artists from the Russian Empire